Trams have been used since the 19th century, and since then, there have been various uses and designs for trams around the world. This article covers the many design types, most notably the articulated, double-decker, drop-centre, low-floor, single ended, double-ended, rubber -tired, and tram-train; and the various uses of trams, both historical and current, most notably cargo trams, a dog car, hearse tram, maintenance trams, a mobile library service, a nursery tram, a restaurant tram, a tourist tram, and as mobile offices.

Types of Tram Designs

Articulated

Articulated trams, invented and first used by the Boston Elevated Railway in 1912–13 at a total length of about twelve meters long (40 ft) for each pioneering example of twin-section articulated tram car, have two or more body sections, connected by flexible joints and a round platform at their pivoting midsection(s). Like articulated buses, they have increased passenger capacity. With this type, the articulation is suspended between carbody sections.

In the Škoda ForCity, which is the world's first 100% low floor tram with pivoting bogies, a Jacobs bogie supports the articulation between the two or more carbody sections. An articulated tram may be low-floor variety or high-floor (regular) variety. At crush loadings this would be even higher.

Double Decker

A double-decker tram is a tram that has two levels. Some double-decker trams have open tops. The earliest double-deck trams were horse drawn. The first electric double-deck trams were those built for the Blackpool Tramway in 1885, one of which survives at the National Tramway Museum.

Double decker trams were commonplace in Great Britain and Dublin in Ireland before most tramways were torn up in the 1950s and 1960s. New York City's New York Railways experimented in 1912 with a Brill double deck Hedley-Doyle stepless centre entrance car, nicknamed the "Broadway Battleship", a term that spread to other large streetcars. Hobart, Tasmania, Australia made extensive use of double decker trams. The most unusual double-decker tram used to run between the isolated Western Australian outback town of Leonora and the nearby settlement of Gwalia.

Double decker trams still operate in Alexandria, Blackpool, Hong Kong, Dubai and Oranjestad.

Drop-Centre (lowered central section)
Many early 20th century trams used a lowered central section between the bogies (trucks). This made passenger access easier, reducing the number of steps required to reach the inside of the vehicle. These cars were frequently referred to as "drop-centres". It is believed that the design first originated in Christchurch, New Zealand, in 1906 when Boon & Co Ltd. built twenty-six such trams in three series. A number of these trams have been preserved. They were a favored design in Australia and New Zealand, with at least 780 such tramcars being built for use in Melbourne alone. Trams built since the 1970s have had conventional high or low floors.

Low floor

This allows them to load passengers, including those in wheelchairs or with perambulators directly from low-rise platforms that are not much more than raised footpaths/sidewalks. This satisfies requirements to provide access to disabled passengers without using expensive wheelchair lifts, while at the same time making boarding faster and easier for other passengers. Passengers appreciate the ease of boarding and alighting from low-floor trams and moving about inside one hundred per cent low-floor trams. Passenger satisfaction with low-floor trams is high. In some jurisdictions this has even been made mandatory since the 1990s, for example by Her Majesty's Railway Inspectorate in Britain and the Disability Discrimination Act in the United Kingdom and other Commonwealth countries.

Various companies have developed low-floor designs, varying from part-low-floor (with internal steps between the low-floor section and the high-floor sections over the bogies), e.g. Citytram and Siemens S70, to one hundred per cent low-floor, where the floor passes through a corridor between the drive wheels, thus maintaining a constant (stepless) level from end to end of the tram.

Prior to the introduction of the Škoda ForCity,, that carried the mechanical penalty of requiring bogies to be fixed and unable to pivot (except for less than 5 degrees in some trams) and thus reducing curve negotiation. This creates undue wear on the tracks and wheels.

Low-floor trams are now running in many cities around the world, including Adelaide, Amsterdam, Bratislava, Dublin, Gold Coast, Helsinki, Hiroshima, Houston, Istanbul, Melbourne, Milan, Prague, Sydney, Lviv and many others.

The Ultra-Low Floor or (ULF) tram is a type of low-floor tram operating in Vienna, Austria, as of 1997 and in Oradea, Romania, with the lowest floor-height of any such vehicle. In contrast to other low-floor trams, the floor in the interior of ULF is at sidewalk height (about 18 cm or 7 inches above the road surface), which makes access to trams easy for passengers in wheelchairs or with baby carriages. This configuration required a new undercarriage. The axles had to be replaced by a complicated electronic steering of the traction motors. Auxiliary devices are installed under the car's roof.

Most low-floor trams carry the mechanical penalty of requiring bogies to be fixed and unable to pivot. This creates undue wear on the tracks and wheels and reduces the speed at which a tram can drive through a curve. Some manufacturers such as Alstom deal with the issue by introducing partially high floor trams. Others, such as Škoda, developed pivoting bogies at the ends and with jacobs bogies between the articulations for the Škoda 15 T, but this solution proved expensive.

Single-ended and Double-ended Trams
A double-ended tram has an operator's cab and controls at each end of the vehicle, which allows it to easily be driven at full speed in either direction on a continuous segment of track. Typically, at the end of a run, the tram's operator will walk from one end of the tram to the other, and then commence the tram route in the other direction. The tram is usually switched to another track by use of crossover points or Y-points. This design also allows for crossovers to be placed along the route to allow for direction switching in mid-route.

Conversely, a single-ended vehicle needs a method of turning at termini so that the operator's cab is in the front of the tram for the reverse journey. This usually necessitates a turning loop or triangle. On the other hand, the single cab and controls and fewer door spaces make the tram lighter, increases passenger accommodation (including many more seats) and effects reductions in equipment, weight, first-cost, maintenance cost, and operating expense.

A single-ended tram has operator's controls at only one end, and can safely be driven at speed in the forward direction but is also capable of reverse movement, typically at slower speed, using a small set of controls at the rear. The configuration of the doors is usually asymmetrical, favouring the side expected to be closest to the street kerb and footpath. At the end of a run, the tram must be turned around via a balloon loop or some other method, to face in the opposite direction for a return trip.

In addition, if overhead electrical power is fed from a trolley pole, the direction of the trolley pole must be reversed at the end of the run, to ensure that the pole is "pulled" behind or "trailing" the vehicle, to avoid 'dewiring'. This was achieved by a member of the crew swinging the pole through 180 degrees (if there was only one pole) or lowering one pole and raising the other if there were two. More commonly nowadays, a bidirectional pantograph may be used to feed power, eliminating the need for an extra procedure when reversing direction.

Two single-ended trams with doors on both sides may be coupled into a (semi-)permanently coupled married pair or twinset, with operator's controls at each end of the combination. Such a setup is operated as if it were a double-ended tram, except that the operator must exit one vehicle and enter the other, when reversing at the end of the run.

Rubber-tyred tram

A rubber-tyred tram is a guided bus which is guided by a fixed rail on the ground and uses overhead cables like a conventional tram. This can allow the vehicles to match the capacity of conventional trams and cope with gradients up to 13% due to the rubber tyres. There are two systems which use this technology: the Guided Light Transit (GLT) and Translohr. The GLT "trams" are legally considered buses as they have steering wheels and can leave the fixed rail when requirements dictate e.g. when journeying to a depot while a Translohr "tram" cannot operate without a guidance rail and are generally not considered buses.

With the development of technologies for self-guided vehicles, it is now possible to dispense with the guide rail.  The Autonomous Rail Rapid Transit system planned for Zouzhou in China follows a virtual track.

Other designs

Modern styling
The Socimi Eurotram series was developed by Socimi of Italy. It is used by Strasbourg, Milan, and Porto. The Eurotram has a modern design that makes it look as much like a train as a tram and has large windows along its entire length.

Modular design
The Alstom Citadis tram, flagship of the French manufacturer Alstom, enjoys an innovative design combining lighter bogies with a modular concept for carriages providing more choices in the types of windows and the number of cars and doors. Dualis is a strictly modular partial low-floor car, with all doors in the low-floor sections.

Uses of Trams

Cargo Tram
Since the 19th century, goods have been carried on rail vehicles through the streets, often near docks and steelworks, for example the Weymouth Harbour Tramway in Weymouth, Dorset. Belgian vicinal tramway routes were used to haul agricultural produce, timber, and coal from Blégny colliery while several of the US interurbans carried freight. In Australia, three different "Freight Cars" operated in Melbourne between 1927 and 1977 and the city of Kislovodsk in Russia had a freight-only tram system consisting of one line which was used exclusively to deliver bottled Narzan mineral water to the railway station.

Until December 2020, the German city of Dresden had a regular CarGoTram service, run by the world's longest tram trainsets, carrying car parts across the city centre to its Volkswagen factory. In addition to this, the cities of Vienna and Zürich have used trams as mobile recycling depots in the past.

At the turn of the 21st century, a new interest has arisen in using urban tramway systems to transport goods. The motivation now is to reduce air pollution, traffic congestion and damage to road surfaces in city centres.

One recent proposal to bring cargo tramways back into wider use was the plan by City Cargo Amsterdam to reintroduce them into the city of Amsterdam. In the spring of 2007 the city piloted this cargo tram operation, which among its aims aimed to reduce particulate pollution in the city by 20% by halving the number of lorries (5,000) unloading in the inner city during the permitted timeframe from 07:00 till 10:30. The pilot involved two cargo trams, operating from a distribution centre and delivering to a "hub" where special electric trucks delivered the trams' small containers to their final destination. The trial was successful, releasing an intended investment of €100 million in a fleet of fifty-two cargo trams distributing from four peripheral "cross docks" to fifteen inner-city hubs by 2012. On weekdays, trams are planned to make 4 deliveries per hour between 7 a.m. and 11 a.m. and two per hour between 11 a.m. and 11 p.m. With each unloading operation taking on average 10 minutes, this means that each site would be active for 40 minutes out of each hour during the morning rush hour. In early 2009 the scheme was suspended owing to the financial crisis impeding fund-raising.

Dog Car
In 1937, Melbourne passenger tramcar C class number 30 was converted for transporting dogs and their owners to the Royal Melbourne Showgrounds. It was known as the "dog car" and was scrapped in 1955.

Hearse tram

Specially appointed hearse trams, or funeral trolley cars, were used for funeral processions in many cities in the late 19th and early 20th century, particularly cities with large tram systems. The earliest known example in North America was Mexico City, which was already operating twenty-six funeral cars in 1886. In the United States, funeral cars were often given names. At the turn of the century, "almost every major city [in the US] had one or more" such cars in operation.

In Milan, Italy, hearse trams were used from the 1880s (initially horse-drawn) to the 1920s. The main cemeteries, Cimitero Monumentale and Cimitero Maggiore, included funeral tram stations. Additional funeral stations were located at Piazza Firenze and at Porta Romana. In the mid-1940s at least one special hearse tram was used in Turin, Italy. It was introduced due to the wartime shortage of automotive fuel. Newcastle, Australia also operated two hearse trams between 1896 and 1948.

Maintenance tram

Most systems had cars that were converted to specific uses on the system, other than simply the carriage of passengers. As just one example of a system, Melbourne used or uses the following "technical" cars: a ballast motor, ballast trailers, blow-down cars, breakdown cars, conductors' or drivers' instruction cars, a laboratory testing car, a line marking car, a pantograph testing car, per way locomotives, a rail hardener locomotive, a scrapper car, scrubbers, sleeper carriers, track cleaners, a welding car, and a wheel transport car. Some were built new for specific purposes, including: rail grinders, scrubbers/track cleaners, and a workshops locomotive.

Mobile library service
Munich tram No.24, delivered in 1912, was refurbished as a mobile library in 1928. Known as "Städtische Wanderbücherei München", it was in public service until 1970. It was preserved and is now on public display in a railway museum in Hanover. Edmonton, Alberta, used a streetcar bookmobile from 1941 to 1956.

Nursery tram
After World War II, in both Warsaw and Wrocław, Poland, so-called "tram-nurseries" were in operation, collecting children from the workplaces of their parents (often tram employees). These mobile nurseries either carried the children around the system or delivered them to the nursery school run by the transport company.

Restaurant tram

A number of systems have introduced restaurant trams, particularly as a tourist attraction. This is specifically a modern trend. Systems which have or have had restaurant trams include Adelaide, Bendigo and Melbourne, in Australia; Brussels in Belgium; The Hague in the Netherlands; Christchurch in New Zealand; Milan, Rome and Turin in Italy; Moscow, Russia; Almaty, Kazakhstan  and Zürich, Switzerland.

Restaurant trams are particularly popular in Melbourne where they operate as the Colonial Tramcar Restaurant. Three of the iconic W class trams were converted to restaurant tram since 1983. All three often run in tandem and there are usually multiple meal sittings. Bookings often close months in advance. As from mid-October 2018, Melbourne's restaurant trams were temporarily taken off the road after failing a Yarra Trams' safety assessment due to badly weathered underlying structures. Until the trams again meet safety standards, the trams are offering stationary dining. As at October 2019, they were still not running.

Bistro trams with buffets operated on ordinary services between 1924 and 2014 on the U76 Rheinbahn route between Krefeld and Düsseldorf in Germany, and for a brief period in 1911 on the Amsterdam-Zandvoort line.

Tourist tram

Many systems have retained historical trams which will often run over parts of the system for tourists and tram enthusiasts.

In Melbourne, Australia, several iconic W class trams run throughout the city in a set route which circles the Central Business District. They are primarily for the use of tourists, although often also used by regular commuters.

Tram-train

A tram-train is a light-rail public transport system where trams run through from an urban tramway network to main-line railway lines which are shared with conventional trains. This allows passengers to travel from suburban areas into city-centre destinations without having to change from a train to a tram.

Tram-train operation uses vehicles such as the Flexity Link and Regio-Alstom Citadis, which are suited for use on urban tram lines and also meet the necessary indication, power, and strength requirements for operation on main-line railways.

It has been primarily developed in Germanic countries, in particular Germany and Switzerland. Karlsruhe is a notable pioneer of the tram-train.

Contractors' mobile office
Two former passenger cars from the Melbourne system were converted and used as mobile offices within the Preston Workshops between 1969 and 1974, by personnel from Commonwealth Engineering and ASEA who were connected with the construction of Melbourne's Z Class cars.

References 

Public transport
Sustainable transport